Ko Sukorn or Ko Sukon or Ko Mu is an island in the Andaman Sea in the Palian District, Trang Province, southwest Thailand. Sukon and mu both mean 'pig'. It has a population of about 3,000.

References

Islands of Thailand
Populated places in Trang province